Grand Ayatollah Sayyid Abbas Modaresi Yazdi  (1943 - 19th November 2020) was an Iraqi Twelver Shi'a Marja.

He is the author of some Islamic books.

He died on 19th November 2020 in Qom, Iran at the age of 77 from a heart attack.

See also
List of Maraji

Notes

External links
رأي سماحة آية الله السيد المدرســي الــيزدي في ابن عربـي وكتبـه
مسلمانان و به ويژه روحانيون به عنوان سربازان امام عصر (عج) بايد خود را ارزيابي کنند
أستاذ الحوزة العلمية آية الله السيد عباس المدرسي اليزدي 

Iranian grand ayatollahs
Iranian Islamists
Shia Islamists
1945 births
Living people